KDLT-TV (channel 46) is a television station in Sioux Falls, South Dakota, United States, affiliated with NBC and Fox. It is owned by Gray Television alongside dual ABC/CW+ affiliate KSFY-TV (channel 13). Both stations share studios in Courthouse Square on 1st Avenue South in Sioux Falls, while KDLT-TV's transmitter is located southeast of the city near Rowena.

KDLV-TV (channel 5) in Mitchell operates as a full-time satellite of KDLT; this station's transmitter is located near Plankinton, South Dakota. KDLV covers areas of south-central and southeastern South Dakota that receive a marginal to non-existent over-the-air signal from KDLT, although there is significant overlap between the two stations' contours otherwise. KDLV is a straight simulcast of KDLT; on-air references to KDLV are limited to Federal Communications Commission (FCC)-mandated hourly station identifications during newscasts and other programming. Aside from the transmitter, KDLV does not maintain any physical presence locally in Mitchell.

History

The Mitchell years
Mitchell Broadcasting Association, owner of radio station KORN, applied on July 30, 1957, to build a new television station on channel 5 in Mitchell, to be located southeast of the city. The Federal Communications Commission (FCC) approved the application on November 13 of that year, but it was more than two years before KORN-TV was built and activated on June 12, 1960. It was a primary affiliate of NBC. The next month, in Sioux Falls, KSOO-TV, forerunner of future sister station KSFY-TV, signed on; the two stations, both NBC affiliates, each served half of the market.

Coinciding with the construction of a new  tower in Salem, midway between Mitchell and Sioux Falls, KORN-TV switched to ABC on May 12, 1969, giving the network its first primary affiliate in South Dakota. The signal traveled in a  radius from the transmitter site, providing city-grade coverage to 23 counties in eastern South Dakota and giving Sioux Falls full service from all three major networks.

Mitchell Broadcasting sold the station to Buford Television of Tyler, Texas, in 1972 for $775,000. The new owners changed the call sign the next year to KXON-TV, as Mitchell Broadcasting retained the KORN radio stations. Additionally, Buford opened a sales office in downtown Sioux Falls, the station's first physical presence in the city. Buford saw the station through a lengthy reconstruction after the Salem tower was felled in an ice storm on March 27, 1975; ice built up on the tower and, aided by gusting winds, led to its collapse. The station reverted to its original tower in Mitchell before a replacement  tower was activated at Salem in mid-1976.

After a proposed purchase of the station by a consortium of investors known as Group Five Television was abandoned in March 1977, Buford put KXON-TV on the market because it had committed to the construction or purchase of four television stations in other parts of the United States.

In October 1977, Buford accepted an offer from George N. Gillett Jr. of Wausau, Wisconsin, to purchase KXON-TV. It was the first holding of his Gillett Broadcasting. Gillett noted that he selected KXON-TV to purchase in part because there were so few TV stations on the market; it was affiliated with ABC, then the top network; and it was a low-band VHF TV station. Gillett made improvements to the presentation of the station's two daily newscasts, then branded Metro News, which had perennially been in third place in the market behind KELO-TV and KSFY. Despite this, channel 5 remained hamstrung in its ability to capture ratings, especially for local news, in Sioux Falls. While KELO-TV and KSFY both had at least three full-power transmitters, KXON only had one. Its news department was small even for a market of Sioux Falls' size at the time; it had only nine reporters, half the size of KSFY and a tenth the size of KELO-TV. It had less equipment than its competitors, and faced the stigma of being considered a "Mitchell station". It did not help matters that KCAU-TV in Sioux City, Iowa put a strong signal to much of the market; for most of the time from the late 1960s to the 1980s, it claimed Sioux Falls as part of its primary coverage area.

Gillett sold KXON-TV in 1982 to Dakotaland Broadcasting, owners of KEVN and KIVV in the Rapid City market. The call letters were changed to KDLT in October 1982 to reflect the new owners and also to "project a new image". The station lost its ABC affiliation the next year after ABC approached KSFY-TV, with its larger network of repeaters and higher ratings, to become its new affiliate in eastern South Dakota. Consequently, KDLT took over KSFY's former NBC affiliation.

Heritage and Red River ownership
Dakotaland's owners decided to exit the business, selling their broadcast holdings to Heritage Communications in 1985. It was the first acquisition of broadcast stations by the group, which became Heritage Media in 1987 when the broadcast stations were spun out from the firm's cable TV systems. That same year, rule changes allowed KDLT to move most of its operations to a studio on South Westport Avenue in Sioux Falls; previously, the station staff was split between the two cities. The new owners focused KDLT's low-rated newscasts, now called Sioux First News, on Sioux Falls events. This was out of necessity; it could not hope to adequately cover the entire 80-county market with just a single transmitter.

Heritage Media sold KDLT to Red River Broadcasting, owner of KVRR in Fargo, North Dakota, in 1994. Red River embarked on a two-pronged campaign to expand KDLT's coverage area. In 1995, it set up low-power translators in Aberdeen, Milbank, Pierre, South Dakota, and Watertown, adding over 84,000 potential viewers to its coverage area. Viewers in these areas had long been served over the air by KELO-TV and KSFY. 

The second phase, however, was even more crucial. FCC rules for the forthcoming introduction of digital television required a station's digital signal to cover at least 80 percent of its analog footprint. In 1989, KDLT had purchased K46CB, a low-powered station in Sioux Falls, to improve its reception in the city. On September 8, 1998, this was replaced with a new full-power facility in Sioux Falls which retained the KDLT call letters. It operated from a new tower in Rowena, where most of the other Sioux Falls stations have their towers. Red River would have preferred to move the channel 5 tower closer to Sioux Falls, but was rebuffed by the FCC. The Salem location was as close as the channel 5 tower could legally get to Sioux Falls while still providing a city-grade signal to its city of license, Mitchell. As a compromise, the station was allowed to operate on channel 46, the lowest channel that was available at the time. As a result, Red River changed channel 5's call letters to KDLV, which was repurposed as a full-time satellite of KDLT for areas west of the city. In December, KDLV moved to a new tower in Plankinton, closer to Mitchell. The changes cost $8 million.

Due to the way in which the changeover was structured legally, the FCC reckons KDLT's current facility in Sioux Falls as a new license dating from 1998, while KDLV in Mitchell operates under KDLT's former license and facility on channel 5. Red River received a construction permit for channel 42 under the KDLV calls on April 1, 1997; it switched callsigns with channel 5 on September 8, 1998.

Consolidation with KSFY-TV
On May 1, 2018, Gray Television announced its purchase of KDLT-TV for $32.5 million. The deal would create a duopoly with KSFY-TV. The combined operation would be based at KSFY's studios on Courthouse Square in Sioux Falls; in its announcement of the KDLT purchase, Gray noted that the KSFY studio has enough space to house a second station's news and sales department. Gray needed to obtain a waiver in order to complete the deal, since the FCC normally does not allow one entity to own two of the four highest-rated stations in a market. However, in its filing requesting such a waiver, Gray argued that KDLT would be in a stronger position to compete in the market if its resources were combined with those of KSFY. Gray contended that a KSFY/KDLT duopoly would fulfill "a dire need for an effective competitor" in the Sioux Falls market, where CBS affiliate KELO-TV has been the far-and-away leader for as long as records have been kept with a local news share of 70 percent and an advertising market share of 55 percent, and said that the market was a "unicorn". The sale was approved by the FCC on September 24, 2019, and was completed the following day. On January 13, 2020, KDLT moved its operations to KSFY's studios on Courthouse Square.

On November 2, 2020, Gray purchased the non-license assets of KTTW (channel 7) from Independent Communications, Inc.; Fox programming moved to KDLT on digital subchannel 46.2. Cozi TV, which was also carried on KTTW, moved to subchannel 46.4. This resulted in all of the network affiliations in eastern South Dakota being controlled by just two companies, Gray and KELO-TV owner Nexstar Media Group.

Programming
KDLT-TV clears the entire NBC network schedule. It airs an alternate live feed of NBC Nightly News at 6 p.m. due to the station's 5:30 p.m. newscast. Syndicated programming currently broadcast on KDLT-TV includes Jeopardy!, Rachael Ray, Hot Bench and Judge Judy.

News operation
KDLT presently broadcasts 19½ hours of locally produced newscasts each week (with 3½ hours each weekday and one hour each on Saturdays and Sundays). With the purchase of this station, KDLT and KSFY merged their news operations on January 13, 2020, rebranding as Dakota News Now.

Technical information
The stations' digital signals are multiplexed:

Analog-to-digital conversion
Both stations shut down their analog signals respectively on February 1, 2009:
 KDLT-TV shut down its analog signal, over UHF channel 46; the station's digital signal remained on its pre-transition UHF channel 47. Through the use of PSIP, digital television receivers display the station's virtual channel as its former UHF analog channel 46.
 KDLV-TV shut down its analog signal, over VHF channel 5; the station's digital signal remained on its pre-transition UHF channel 26. Through the use of PSIP, digital television receivers display the station's virtual channel as its former VHF analog channel 5.

Translators
KDLV is rebroadcast on the following translator stations:

Transmitter antenna beacon bulb replacement
The station's television transmitter antenna beacon bulb replacement on the KDLT tower was featured on the National Geographic Channel television show World's Toughest Fixes.

Note

References

External links

NBC network affiliates
Fox network affiliates
Antenna TV affiliates
Television channels and stations established in 1960
1960 establishments in South Dakota
DLT-TV
Gray Television